Moriconi is a surname. Notable people with the surname include:

Valeria Moriconi (1931–2005), Italian actress
Massimo Moriconi (disambiguation), multiple people